A Town Has Turned to Dust is a 1998 update of A Town Has Turned to Dust (1958), written by Rod Serling. It was originally shown on the Syfy Channel.

Plot
Jerry Paul is a successful, racist dweller-merchant whose wife is overly attentive to their driver-servant Tommy. Jerry has Tommy arrested on false charges of rape and theft. The town's Sheriff Denton is unable to stop a vigilante mob led by Jerry from lynching Tommy but the incident is recorded by a TV reporter named Hannify, who is visiting Earth from New Angeles. The rest of the story revolves around how the report is used, revelations of a past crime, and a showdown in the style of High Noon.

Cast
Stephen Lang (Sheriff Harvey Denton)
Ron Perlman (Jerry Paul)
Gabriel Olds (Hannify)
Barbara Jane Reams (Maya Paul)
Frankie Avina (Tooth)
Zahn McClarnon (Tommy Tall Bear)
Judy Collins (Ree)
M. Scott Wilkinson (Wavy Flagg)

References

External links
 

1998 television films
1998 films
1990s science fiction films
Films directed by Rob Nilsson
Films set in the 23rd century
American post-apocalyptic films
American science fiction television films
Syfy original films
Films with screenplays by Rod Serling
1990s English-language films
1990s American films